This is a summary of 1996 in music in the United Kingdom, including the official charts from that year.

Summary
This year saw the start of an increase in the number of number 1 singles. 24 hit the top spot this year, the highest since 1980, which had an equal number.

The first number 1 single of the year was "Jesus to a Child", George Michael's first solo #1 for 10 years. This was followed by Babylon Zoo's "Spaceman", which had been used in an advert for Levi's. The single was quite different from the version used in the advert, which had been sped up and re-arranged. It stayed at #1 for five weeks, sold over a million copies, and Jas Mann, the man behind Babylon Zoo, became the first solo male to make their chart debut at number 1.

After five years, the boy band Take That announced that they were splitting up, resulting in such distress for their many fans that a telephone helpline had to be set up. Their final number 1 came in March, a cover of the Bee Gees song "How Deep Is Your Love". Several of the members went on to start a solo career, with Gary Barlow the first to hit #1 with "Forever Love" in July. However, it would be Robbie Williams who would go on to score the most success as a solo artist.

After George Michael scored another number 1 with "Fastlove" in April, Gina G reached the top spot with "Ooh Aah... Just a Little Bit" in May. This song was the UK's entry to the 1996 Eurovision Song Contest, and originally reached #6 when it was released at the beginning of April. It hovered around the top 5 for the next few weeks, before moving up to 1 in the week of the contest. Although it failed to win, it still became the first Eurovision song to hit #1 since Nicole's "A Little Peace", which won the contest in 1982.

The next number 1 was also influenced by media events: "Three Lions", released by comedians David Baddiel and Frank Skinner and the band The Lightning Seeds, was the official song of the 1996 European Football Championship (Euro '96), which was being held in England. A rewritten version of the song ("Three Lions '98") would reach number 1 two years later, coinciding with the Football World Cup 1998 (France '98).

The Fugees had the biggest selling single of the year, with a cover of Roberta Flack's "Killing Me Softly With His Song". It sold over a million copies.

However, by far the most successful act of the year was the Spice Girls, who kickstarted their career with three number 1 singles – the million-selling "Wannabe" in July, which was one of the longest No 1 stints by any girl group (7 weeks); (Shakespears Sister's "Stay" is the longest girl group No 1, with 8 weeks), and remains the biggest-selling single by a girl group; "Say You'll Be There" in October; and "2 Become 1" in December, also a million seller, the year's Christmas number one single and the UK's fastest selling single of 1996. The Spice Girls debut album Spice was the fastest selling album of 1996, shifting over 1.8 million copies in just 7 weeks. It was also the Number 1 album for Christmas 1996 and the second best-selling album of the year.

Oasis smashed the record for most weeks in the singles chart (previously held by Adam and the Ants in 1981) with 134 weeks, thanks to mass waves of re-entries of songs from their back catalogue throughout the year.

1996 is also grimly notable for having the drummers of two popular bands, Mathew Fletcher of Heavenly, on 14 June, and Chris Acland of Lush, on 17 October, commit suicide. Lush had at the time been in the final stages of planning an American tour, which his devastated bandmates cancelled; they then disbanded.

Prolific classical composer Peter Maxwell Davies produced the tenth of his Strathclyde Concertos, an orchestral work which was first performed in Glasgow in October by the Scottish Chamber Orchestra, under the composer's baton.  In June, his new opera, The Doctor of Myddfai, was premièred in Cardiff.  Other British composers who produced new works were Michael Berkeley (Viola Concerto) and John Tavener (Innocence).  Andrew Lloyd Webber's new musical, Whistle Down the Wind opened in Washington D.C. in December, to poor reviews, but its score would go on to provide Boyzone with one of the best-selling singles of the decade in the form of "No Matter What"; the show did not appear in the West End until 1998.

Events
 19 February – Jarvis Cocker disrupts a performance by Michael Jackson at the BRIT Awards. During an elaborate staging of "Earth Song" Cocker and Peter Mansell (a former Pulp member) invade the stage; Cocker lifts his shirt and points his bottom in Jackson's direction before getting into a scuffle with security. He is arrested and taken for questioning (with Bob Mortimer acting as his solicitor), but is released without charge.  Cocker later states that his actions were "a form of protest at the way Michael Jackson sees himself as some kind of Christ-like figure with the power of healing".
 28 February – At the 38th Annual Grammy Awards in Los Angeles:
Trevor Horn (producer) & Seal win Record of the Year for "Kiss From a Rose".
Christopher Hogwood (conductor), Sylvia McNair & the Academy of Ancient Music win Best Classical Vocal Performance for The Echoing Air – The Music of Henry Purcell. 
Annie Lennox wins Best Female Pop Vocal Performance for "No More I Love You's".  
The Chieftains and Van Morrison win Best Pop Collaboration with Vocals for "Have I Told You Lately"
 1 March - Status Quo take BBC Radio One to the High Court over a dispute in which the station refused to play their single "Fun Fun Fun".  The band loses their case, with Radio One arguing that Status Quo don't fit the demographic audience that the station is reaching out to.
 2 March – Melody Maker praises Jarvis Cocker for his protest at the Brit Awards ceremony, suggesting he should be knighted.
 4 March – The Beatles' second reunion song is released as part of their first reunion since the band's breakup 26 years earlier. The song is a finished version of "Real Love", a John Lennon demo from 1980.
 22 March - Black Grape perform a cover of "Pretty Vacant" by The Sex Pistols on TFI Friday on Channel 4.  During the performance, Shaun Ryder uses several f-words and the incident results in Ryder being banned from live broadcasting and TFI Friday being recorded instead of being broadcast live.
 1 April - John Squire announces his departure from The Stone Roses.  He is replaced by Aziz Ibrahim, formerly of Simply Red.
 28 April – Oasis play the second of two gigs in Maine Road, home of Manchester City F.C., featured on the video "…There and Then".
June – Musicians listed in the Queen's Birthday Honours include songwriter Ivan Morrison, clarinetist Emma Johnson, jazz pianist George Shearing and opera singer Felicity Lott.
 21 June - The Sex Pistols reform and begin their 78-date Filthy Lucre Tour. This would be the first time the band have performed together since their original breakup in 1978, and their first with Glen Matlock since his original departure in 1977. 
 8 July – The Spice Girls release their début single "Wannabe" in the United Kingdom.The song proves to be a global hit, hitting number 1 in 31 countries and becoming not only the biggest-selling début single by an all-female group but also the biggest-selling single by an all-female group of all time.
July – The Spice Girls appear in Top of the Pops magazine, where each member is given a nickname based upon her image: "Posh Spice", "Baby Spice", "Scary Spice", "Ginger Spice", and "Sporty Spice".
 22 July - Rob Collins, keyboardist with The Charlatans, is killed in a car crash on a country road outside Monmouth.  
 10 August -  Oasis play 2 nights at Knebworth House with an audience of 125,000 per night. Over 2.5 million people applied for tickets for the shows, making it the largest ever demand for concert tickets in British history.  They are supported by The Charlatans, Kula Shaker, Manic Street Preachers, The Bootleg Beatles, The Chemical Brothers, Ocean Colour Scene and The Prodigy
 25 August - The Stone Roses perform a disastrous final gig at the Reading Festival. The performance received a negative reception from fans and critics, with Ian Brown's vocals being particularly criticised.  The band would then split up in October.
 4 September - Oasis perform "Champagne Supernova" at the MTV Video Music Awards, held in New York.  During the performance, Liam Gallagher makes obscene gestures at brother Noel as he was playing his guitar solo, then spat beer all over the stage before storming off.
 31 October – David Brookes is fined £45 in Hampstead Magistrates' Court for disrupting the "quiet enjoyment" of the public by playing his bagpipes on Hampstead Heath. Described as "a pain in the neck" by a spokesperson for the College of Pipers in Glasgow, Brookes said he had been playing the pipes on the heath for twenty years and had been given permission to do so, adding that he was surprised by the ruling because social workers were allowed to distribute condoms there.
November – Jesus Christ Superstar is revived in London's West End. Directed by Gale Edwards, this version stars Steve Balsamo and Zubin Varla as Jesus and Judas, with Joanna Ampil as Mary Magdalene, and a recording is released as an album.
 12 December - Mike Joyce, former drummer with The Smiths, is awarded £1 million in missing royalties and damages from former bandmates Morrissey and Johnny Marr in the High Court.

Charts

Number-one singles

Number-one albums

Number-one compilation albums

Year-end charts

Best-selling singles

Best-selling albums

Best-selling compilation albums

Notes:

Classical music
Michael Garrett – Fantasia No. 2 for string orchestra, Op. 111
Peter Maxwell Davies –
Strathclyde Concerto No. 10: Concerto for Orchestra
Symphony No. 6
Howard Blake – Flute Concerto

Opera
Peter Maxwell Davies – The Doctor of Myddfai

Musical films
James and the Giant Peach

Births
1 February – Dionne Bromfield, singer-songwriter and TV presenter
15 May – Birdy, singer

Deaths
17 January – Harry Robertson, musician, bandleader, music director and composer, 63
21 January – the London Boys:
Edem Ephraim, 36 (car accident)
Dennis Fuller, 36 (car accident)
17 February – Evelyn Laye, actress and singer, 95
19 March – Alan Ridout, composer, 61
8 April – Donald Adams, opera singer and actor, 67 (brain tumour) 
6 May – Wally Nightingale, guitarist, 40 (drug-related)
19 June – Vivian Ellis, composer, 93
17 July – Chas Chandler (The Animals), 57 (heart attack)
22 July – Rob Collins, keyboard player, 33 (car crash)
12 October – Vernon Elliott, bassoonist, conductor and composer, 84
17 October – Chris Acland, drummer, 30 (suicide)
23 October – Alexander Kelly, pianist and composer, 67
12 November – Gwen Catley, operatic soprano, 90
28 November – Anna Pollak, operatic mezzo-soprano, 84
14 December – Norman Hackforth, accompanist and broadcaster, 87
15 December – Dave Kaye, pianist, 90
17 December – Ruby Murray, singer and actress, 61 
23 December – Ronnie Scott, jazz musician and club owner, 69

Music awards

BRIT Awards
The 1996 BRIT Awards winners were:

Artist of a generation: Michael Jackson
Best British producer: Brian Eno
Best soundtrack: "Batman Forever"
British album: Oasis – "(What's the Story) Morning Glory"
British breakthrough act: Supergrass
British dance act: Massive Attack
British female solo artist: Annie Lennox
British group: Oasis
British male solo artist: Paul Weller
British single: Take That – "Back for Good"
British video: Oasis – "Wonderwall"
Freddie Mercury award: The Help Album for the Charity Warchild
International breakthrough act: Alanis Morissette
International female: Björk
International group: Bon Jovi
International male: Prince
Outstanding contribution: David Bowie

Mercury Music Prize
The 1996 Mercury Music Prize was awarded to Pulp – Different Class.

See also
 1996 in British radio
 1996 in British television
 1996 in the United Kingdom
 List of British films of 1996

References

External links
BBC Radio 1's Chart Show
The Official Charts Company

 
British music
Music
British music by year
20th century in music